The Argo Hotel in Nebraska is a historic hotel listed on the U.S. National Register of Historic Places.  Also or previously known as The New Meridian Hotel and as The New Meridian Sanatorium, it is Nebraska historic site NeHBS #KX05-015.  It was built as a hotel in 1912 and was converted to a health clinic in 1940.

Its interior features a tin ceiling on the first floor, and transom windows over the guest room doors.

References

External links 

Hotel buildings on the National Register of Historic Places in Nebraska
Buildings designated early commercial in the National Register of Historic Places
Hotel buildings completed in 1912
Buildings and structures in Knox County, Nebraska
Hotels in Nebraska
1912 establishments in Nebraska